Chagpori, Chakpori, Chokpori, Chagpo Ri (literally "Iron Mountain") is a spirit-mountain of Vajrapani within the city of Lhasa in Tibet. It south of the Potala and just to the left when one is facing the Potala. It is considered to be one of the four holy mountains of central Tibet.

Chagpori was the site of the monastic medical college of the same name founded there by Sangye Gyatso in 1696. This medical college, which incorporated a recently restored temple made by Thang Tong Gyalpo, was supplied with revenue generating lands and with a constant stream of students by a "monk tax". It remained an important medical institution in Tibet and Central Asia up until the mid-Twentieth century. Peter Aufschnaiter was photographed by Heinrich Harrer on top of the College of Medicine (Men-Tsee-Khang) using a theodolite for surveying the city of Lhasa. Aufschnaiter wrote, "Since 23 December 1947 I have been staying in Lhasa for some months to make a town plan, and have now been appointed to the government service by a decree of the Regent."

During the March 1959 Lhasa uprising, the medical school established by the Thirteenth Dalai Lama named Men-Tsee-Khang and a temple housing statutes of coral (Tsepame), mother-of-pearl (of Tujechempo) and turquoise (of Drolma) were demolished by the People's Liberation Army artillery as the Tibetans had placed a few cannons up there. Jianglin Li's book Tibet in Agony: Lhasa 1959 says,The monk Jampa Phuntsok of the Namgyal Monastery recalled,  It is now crowned by radio antennas. A road has been constructed through the spur that used to connect Chagpori with the Marpori ('Red Hill') on which the Potala is built. At this spur connecting these two hills was the famous chorten Pargo Kaling, a spired reliquary with an arch that served as the town's western gate and was demolished in 1967 and rebuilt in 1995.

Some rebuilding has since taken place a number of old rock carvings have survived through damage. Some of them are thought to have been carved during the reign of king Songtsen Gampo (605 or 617? - 649 CE) and painted by Nepalese artists. Some buildings have been rebuilt near the base of the hill and there is now again a small temple with prayer wheels.

Tradition has it that the three main hills of Lhasa represent the "Three Protectors of Tibet." Chagpori is the soul-mountain (bla-ri) of Vajrapani, Pongwari that of Manjushri, and Marpori, the hill on which the Potala stands, represents Chenresig or Avalokiteshvara.

Footnotes

Mountains of Lhasa